is a Japanese actress, voice actress and tarento. She is affiliated with Himawari Theatre Group. Debuting as an actress during her early childhood, she would then begin acting in television dramas, live-action films, and dubs of foreign movies. As a voice actress, she is known for her roles as Megumi Amatsuka in GJ Club, Rumia Tingel in Akashic Records of Bastard Magic Instructor, and Rikka Takarada in SSSS.Gridman. She also voiced Lilo in the Japanese dub of the cartoon series Lilo & Stitch: The Series and Magine / Zenkai Magine in Kikai Sentai Zenkaiger.

Biography
Miyamoto was born in Fukuoka on January 22, 1997. She became affiliated with Himawari Theatre Group at the age of four, and moved to Tokyo at the age of six to continue her acting career. She debuted as an actress in the television program Hamidashikeiji Jounetsukei, and she would then appear in the series Ai no Ie: Nakimushi Sato to 7-Ri no Ko at the age of six. She continued acting in television dramas and movies, such as appearing in an episode of the Japanese television drama Socrates in Love. She voiced the character of Lilo in the Japanese dub of Lilo & Stitch: The Series.

In 2013, Miyamoto played her first main role in an anime series as Megumi Amatsuka in GJ Club. Miyamoto and Maya Uchida performed the series' first ending theme , while Miyamoto, Uchida, Suzuko Mimori, and Chika Arakawa performed the series' fourth ending theme .

In 2016, Miyamoto played the role of Mahiru Kasumi in the multimedia franchise Aikatsu Stars!. In 2017, she played the role of Rumia Tingel in the anime series Akashic Records of Bastard Magic Instructor. Miyamoto, Akane Fujita, and Ari Ozawa performed the series' ending theme "Precious You". In 2018, she played the roles of Yuri Kazami in Miss Caretaker of Sunohara-sou and Rikka Takarada in SSSS.Gridman.

In 2021, she played the lead female role of Magine in the tokusatsu series Kikai Sentai Zenkaiger.

Filmography

Television drama
Hamidashikeiji Jounetsukei

2003
 Ai no Ie: Nakimushi Sato to 7-Ri no Ko

2004
 Socrates in Love

2010
 Ryōmaden as Kimie
2021
 Kikai Sentai Zenkaiger as Magine / Zenkai Magine

Film
2008
 Gu-Gu Datte Neko de Aru
2021
 Kikai Sentai Zenkaiger THE MOVIE: Red Battle! All Sentai Rally!! as Magine / Zenkai Magine
 Saber + Zenkaiger: Super Hero Senki as Magine / Zenkai Magine
2022
 Kamen Rider Saber Spin-Off: Kamen Rider Sabela & Durendal as servant lady

V-Cinema
 Kikai Sentai Zenkaiger VS Kiramager VS Senpaiger

Television animation
2005
 Capeta as Monami Suzuki
 Sugar Sugar Rune as Sophia Takigawa (ep 20)
 Mushishi as Ito (younger; ep 17); Mayu (ep 4); Mushi (ep 1)

2006
 Ghost Hunt as Ayami Morishita

2008

 Rental Magica as Dragon Girl (eps 22–24)

2011
 Infinite Stratos as Girl (ep 12)

2012
 Kids on the Slope as Girl (ep 9); Sachiko (7 episodes)

2013
 GJ Club as Megumi Amatsuka

2016
 Aikatsu Stars! as Mahiru Kasumi

2017
 Akashic Records of Bastard Magic Instructor as Rumia Tingel

2018
 Miss Caretaker of Sunohara-sou as Yuri Kazami
 SSSS.Gridman as Rikka Takarada

2019
 Bermuda Triangle: Colorful Pastrale as Adele
 Dororo as Okowa (ep 19)

2020
 ID: Invaded as Kaeru/Kiki Asukai
Seton Academy: Join the Pack! as Hitomi Hino
Sing "Yesterday" for Me as Haru Nonoka
Tamayomi as Rei Okada
 The Misfit of Demon King Academy as Xia Minsheng

2021
Godzilla Singular Point as Mei Kamino
Those Snow White Notes as Shuri Maeda
Blue Period as Maki Kuwana
Taisho Otome Fairy Tale as Tamako Shima

2022
Teasing Master Takagi-san 3 as Chi Nishikata
Tomodachi Game as Shiho Sawaragi
Black Summoner as Rion
Mobile Suit Gundam: The Witch from Mercury as Nika Nanaura (episodes 1–9)

2023
The Fire Hunter as Hotaru
Too Cute Crisis as Rasta Cole
Why Raeliana Ended Up at the Duke's Mansion as Raeliana McMillan/Rinko Hanasaki
AI no Idenshi as Risa Higuchi
Chained Soldier as Himari Azuma

Original video animation
 2019
 Fragtime as Haruka Murakami

Theatrical animation
2007
 Summer Days with Coo as Kindergarten Classmate
2020
 Josee, the Tiger and the Fish as Mai Ninomiya

2022
 Teasing Master Takagi-san: The Movie as Chi Nishikata

2023
 Gridman Universe as Rikka Takarada

Video games
2018
 Kantai Collection as Minegumo, Nisshin, Abyssal Sun Princess

2017
 Kingdom Hearts HD 2.8 Final Chapter Prologue as Ava

2021
The Caligula Effect 2 as Kiriko Miyasako
 Phantasy Star Online 2: New Genesis as Manon
Azur Lane as Rikka Takarada

2022
Stranger of Paradise: Final Fantasy Origin as Princess Sarah'Dubbing roles
Live-action
 All of Us Are Dead as Nam On-jo
 Cinderella Man as Rosemarie "Rosy" Braddock
 Flightplan as Julia Pratt
 I Am Mother as Daughter

Animation
 Bambi II as Faline
 Frankenweenie as Weird Girl
 Lilo & Stitch: The Series'' as Lilo

References

External links
 Official agency profile 
 
 
 
 

1997 births
Living people
Japanese actresses
Japanese child actresses
Japanese video game actresses
Japanese voice actresses
Voice actresses from Fukuoka Prefecture
21st-century Japanese actresses